The badminton women's singles tournament at the 2002 Asian Games in Busan took place from 10 November to 13 November at Gangseo Gymnasium.

Schedule
All times are Korea Standard Time (UTC+09:00)

Results
Legend
r — Retired

References
2002 Asian Games Official Report, Pages 267

External links
 2002 Asian Games Official Website

Women's singles